Eurrhyparodes sculdus is a moth in the family Crambidae. It was described by Harrison Gray Dyar Jr. in 1914. It is found in Panama.

The wingspan is about 12 mm. The forewings are dark brown with a purplish lustre. The inner line is straight, dark and obscure. The outer line has two teeth, relieved by narrow straw-coloured patches before the teeth and following most of the line outwardly. The base of the hindwings is pale whitish, tinged with straw colour.

References

Moths described in 1914
Spilomelinae